Rafoo Chakkar is a 1975 Indian Hindi-language comedy film produced by Nadiadwala and directed by Narender Bedi. The film was adapted from the 1959 American film Some Like It Hot.

The film stars Rishi Kapoor and Neetu Singh, who were at the height of their popularity as an on-screen couple at the time of this film's release. Other actors include Paintal, Bindu and Madan Puri, along with Rajindernath,  Asrani and Bhagwan. The music was composed by Kalyanji Anandji.

Plot
The plot follows the general outline of Some Like it Hot. Two out-of-work musicians (Rishi Kapoor and Paintal) witness a murder and are spotted by the villains. In order to save themselves, they decide to disguise themselves as girls and hop on to a train to Kashmir with other girls in a singing band, where they met Neetu Singh, Bindoo and Asrani. The plot twists when band manager Rajindernath falls in love with the 'girl' Paintal, and Rishi Kapoor tries to impress Neetu Singh by pretending to be an oil tycoon named Esso [A popular oil marketing firm). At the end of the movie, the male musicians' real identities are revealed. However, the romantic pairs remain intact by the end credits, including Rajindernath and Paintal. The movie ends with the same line as Some Like it Hot: "Nobody's perfect!"

Cast
Rishi Kapoor as Dev / Devi
Neetu Singh as Ritu
Rajinder Nath as Salma's Admirer
Faryal as In-charge of girls' band
Asrani as Kanhaiyalal Chaturvedi
Paintal as Salim/Salma
Mumtaz Begum as Salim's Mother
Madan Puri as Prakash
Viju Khote as Prakash's security guard
Anwar Hussain as Ranjit
Sulochana as Shanti
Shetty as Raka
Bhagwan as S. Manglani's secretary
Jankidas as Member of S. Manglani group
Mohan Sherry as Duo
Mac Mohan
M. Rajan as Member of S. Manglani group
Hiralal as Member of S. Manglani group
Lalita Kumari as Ritu's Aunt
Narendra Nath as Himself
Bachan Singh as Watchman
Bhushan Tiwari as Police Informer

Crew
Director - Narendra Bedi
Producer - I. A. Nadiadwala
Story - Jayant Dharmadhikari
Screenplay - K. K. Shukla
Dialogue - Kader Khan, Raj Bedi
Cinematographer - Peter Pareira
Editor - Babubhai Thakkar

Soundtrack

Trivia
In the eponymous Feluda novel Joy Baba Felunath, Feluda shares his plan of watching this movie on the ninth day (Nobomi) of Durgapuja.

Awards and nominations

|-
| 1976
| Asrani
| Filmfare Best Comedian Award
| 
|}

References

External links
 

1975 films
1970s Hindi-language films
Films directed by Narendra Bedi
Films scored by Kalyanji Anandji
Cross-dressing in Indian films
Films set on trains
Indian comedy films
1975 comedy films
Hindi-language comedy films
Indian remakes of American films